The Stanford dragon is a computer graphics 3D test model created with a Cyberware 3030 Model Shop (MS) Color 3D Scanner at Stanford University. The data for the model was produced in 1996.

The dragon consists of data describing 871,414 triangles determined by 3D scanning a real figurine. The data set is often used to test various graphics algorithms, including polygonal simplification, compression, and surface smoothing, similar to the Stanford bunny (1993).

The model is available in different file formats (.ply, vrml, vl, etc.) on the internet for free.


See also
List of common 3D test models
Stanford bunny

Notes

References

External links

 The Stanford 3D Scanning Repository provides the Stanford dragon model for download
 Large Geometric Models Archive at Georgia Tech provides the Stanford dragon model for download in standard file formats

3D graphics models
Test items
Dragons in art